[[File:Man of Gaochang (高昌國, Turfan) in 番客入朝圖 (937-976 CE).jpg|thumb|Man of Gaochang (高昌國, Turfan) in "Entrance of the foreign visitors" (番客入朝圖) (937-976 CE)]]
Qocho or Kara-Khoja, also known as Idiqut, ("holy wealth"; "glory"; "lord of fortune") was a Uyghur kingdom created in 843, with strong Chinese Buddhist and Tocharian influences. It was founded by Uyghur refugees fleeing the destruction of the Uyghur Khaganate after being driven out by the Yenisei Kirghiz. They made their summer capital in Qocho (also called Gaochang or Qara-Khoja, near modern Turpan) and winter capital in Beshbalik (modern Jimsar County, also known as Tingzhou). Its population is referred to as the "Xizhou Uyghurs" after the old Tang Chinese name for Gaochang, the Qocho Uyghurs after their capital, the Kucha Uyghurs after another city they controlled, or the Arslan (lion) Uyghurs after their king's title.

Timeline
In 843, a group of Uyghurs migrated southward under the leadership of Pangtele, and occupied Karasahr and Kucha, taking them from the Tibetan Empire.

In 856, this group of Uyghurs received royal recognition from the Tang dynasty. At this time, their capital was in Karasahr (Yanqi).

In 866, Pugu Jun declared himself khan and adopted the title of idiqut. The Kingdom of Qocho captured Xizhou (Gaochang), Tingzhou (Beshbalik, or Beiting), Changbaliq (near Ürümqi) and Luntai (Bugur) from the Guiyi Circuit. The Uyghur capital was moved to Xizhou (Gaochang/Qocho), which the Uyghurs called Idiqutshari. Beshbalik became their summer residence.

In 869 and 870 the Kingdom of Qocho attacked the Guiyi Circuit but was repelled. In 876 the Kingdom of Qocho seized Yizhou from the Guiyi Circuit, after which it came to be called Kumul. In 880, Qocho attacked Shazhou (Dunhuang) but was repelled. By 887, they were settled under an agrarian lifestyle in Qocho.

In 904, Zhang Chengfeng of the Guiyi Circuit attacked Qocho and seized Yizhou (Hami/Kumul) and Xizhou (Gaochang). This occupation ended after the Jinshan Kingdom's loss to the Ganzhou Uyghur Kingdom in 911. In 954, Ilig Bilgä Tengri rose to power. In 981, Arslan Bilgä Tengri ilig rose to power. In 984, Arslan Bilgä Tengri ilig became Süngülüg Khagan.  In the same year, a Song dynasty envoy reached Qocho and gave an account of the city:

In 996, Bügü Bilgä Tengri ilig succeeded Süngülüg Khagan.

In 1007, Alp Arsla Qutlugh Kül Bilgä Tengri Khan succeeded Bügü Bilgä Tengri ilig. In 1008, Manichaean temples are converted to Buddhist temples. In 1024, Kül Bilgä Tengri Khan succeeded Alp Arsla Qutlugh Kül Bilgä Tengri Khan. In 1068, Tengri Bügü il Bilgä Arslan Tengri Uighur Tärkän succeeded Kül Bilgä Tengri Khan. By 1096, Qocho had lost Aksu, Tumshuk, and Kucha to the Karakhanids.

In 1123, Bilgä rose to power. He was succeeded by Yur Temur at some point. In 1128, the Kingdom of Qocho became a vassal of the Qara Khitai.

In 1209, the Kingdom of Qocho became a vassal of the Mongol Empire.

In 1229, Barčuq Art iduq-qut succeeded Yur Temur. In, 1242 Kesmez iduq-qut succeeded Barčuq Art iduq-qut. In 1246, Salïndï Tigin iduq-qut succeeded Kesmez iduq-qut. In 1253, Ögrünch Tigin iduq-qut succeeded Salïndï Tigin iduq-qut. In, 1257 Mamuraq Tigin iduq-qut succeeded Ögrünch Tigin iduq-qut, who was executed for supporting the Ogodeid branch of the Genghisid family. In 1266, Qosqar Tigin iduq-qut succeeded Mamuraq Tigin iduq-qut. In 1280, Negüril Tigin iduq-qut succeeded Qosqar Tigin iduq-qut.

In 1318, Negüril Tigin iduq-qut died.  Later, the Kingdom of Qocho became part of the Chagatai Khanate. In 1322, Tämir Buqa iduq-qut rose to power. In 1330, Senggi iduq-qut succeeded Tämir Buqa iduq-qut. In 1332, Taipindu iduq-qut succeeded Senggi iduq-qut. In 1352, Ching Timür iduq-qut succeeded Taipindu iduq-qut and was the last known ruler governor of the kingdom. By the 1370s, the Kingdom of Qocho ceased to exist.

Religion

Mainly Turkic and Tocharian, but also Chinese and Iranian peoples such as the Sogdians were assimilated into the Uyghur Kingdom of Qocho. Chinese were among the population of Qocho. Peter B. Golden writes that the Uyghurs not only adopted the writing system and religious faiths of the Sogdians, such as Manichaeism, Buddhism, and Christianity, but also looked to the Sogdians as "mentors" while gradually replacing them in their roles as Silk Road traders and purveyors of culture.

Manichaeism
The Uyghur ruling family of Qocho were mainly practitioners of Manichaeism until the early 11th century, although by the 960s, they also supported Buddhism. When Al-Muqtadir (r. 908-932) of the Abbasid Caliphate began persecuting Manichaeans in what is now Iraq, the ruler of Qocho sent a letter to Nasr II of the Samanid Empire threatening to retaliate against Muslims in his realm. Manichaean monks accompanied Uyghur embassies from 934-951 while between 965-1022, the accompanying monks were Buddhists. Manichaeism in Qocho probably reached its peak in 866 and was gradually replaced by Buddhism afterward. This shift was noticeable by 1008 when Manichaean temples were converted to Buddhist temples. Part of the reason for Manichaeism's decline may have been the lifestyle of the Manichaean clergy. A decree discovered in Turpan reports that Manichaean clerics lived in great comfort, possessed estates with serfs and slaves, ate fine food, and wore expensive garments.

Chinese Buddhism
Tang rule over Qocho and Turfan left a lasting Chinese Buddhist influence on the area. Tang names remained on more than 50 Buddhist temples with Emperor Taizong of Tang's edicts stored in the "Imperial Writings Tower " and Chinese dictionaries like Jingyun, Yupian, Tang yun, and da zang jing (Buddhist scriptures) stored inside the Buddhist temples. Uyghur Buddhists studied the Chinese language and used Chinese books like the Thousand Character Classic and the Qieyun. It was written that "In Qocho city were more than fifty monasteries, all titles of which are granted by the emperors of the Tang dynasty, which keep many Buddhist texts as the Tripiṭaka, Tangyun, Yupuan, Jingyin etc."

The Uyghurs of Qocho continued to produce the Chinese Qieyun rime dictionary and developed their own pronunciations of Chinese characters. They viewed the Chinese script as "very prestigious" so when they developed the Old Uyghur alphabet, based on the Syriac script, they deliberately switched it to vertical like Chinese writing from its original horizontal position in Syriac.

Persian monks still maintained a Manichaean temple in the kingdom but the 10th century Persian geography book Hudud al-'Alam called Qocho, the capital city, a "Chinese town".

 Ethnicity 

James A. Millward claimed that the Uyghurs were generally "Mongoloid" (an archaic term meaning "appearing ethnically Eastern or Inner Asian"), giving as an example the images of Uyghur patrons of Buddhism in Bezeklik, temple 9, until they began to mix with the Tarim Basin's original, Indo-European-speaking "Caucasoid" inhabitants, such as the so-called Tocharians. Buddhist Uyghurs created the Bezeklik murals.

Religious conflict

Kara-Khanid Khanate
The Uyghurs of Qocho were Buddhists whose religious identity were intertwined with their religion. Qocho was a Buddhist state with both state-sponsored Mahayana Buddhism and Manichaeism. The Uyghurs sponsored the construction of many of the temple-caves in what is now called the Bezeklik Caves. Although they retained some of their culture, they were heavily influenced by the indigenous peoples of western China and abandoned the Old Turkic alphabet in favor of a modified Sogdian alphabet, which later came to be known as the Old Uyghur alphabet. The Idiquts (the title of the Qocho rulers) ruled independently until they become a vassal state of the Qara Khitai (Chinese: "Western Liao").

The Buddhist Uyghurs frequently came into conflict with their western Muslim neighbors. Muslim Turks described the Uyghurs in a number of derogatory ways. For example, the '"Compendium of the Turkic Dialects" by Mahmud al-Kashgari> states that "just as the thorn should be cut at its root, so the Uighur should be struck on the eye". They also used the derogatory word "Tat" to describe the Buddhist Uyghurs, which means "infidels". Uyghurs were also called dogs.https://web.archive.org/web/20151118063834/http://projects.iq.harvard.edu/huri/files/viii-iv_1979-1980_part1.pdf p. 160. While al-Kashgari displayed a different attitude towards the Turk diviners beliefs and "national customs", he expressed towards Buddhism a hatred in his Diwan where he wrote the verse cycle on the war against Uyghur Buddhists. Buddhist origin words like toyin (a cleric or priest) and Burxān or Furxan (meaning Buddha, acquiring the generic meaning of "idol" in the Turkic language of Kashgari) had negative connotations to Muslim Turks.

The Uyghurs were subjected to attacks by Muslim Turks, according to Kashgari's work. The Kara-Khanid Khanate's ruler Sultan Satuq Bughra Khan razed Qocho's Buddhist temples in the Minglaq province across the Ili region . Buddhist murals at the Bezeklik Thousand Buddha Caves were damaged by local Muslim population whose religion proscribed figurative images of sentient beings, the eyes and mouths in particular were often gouged out. Pieces of murals were also broken off for use as fertilizer by the locals. The Islamic-Buddhist conflict from the 11th to 12th centuries are still recalled in the forms of the Khotan Imam Asim Sufi shrine celebration and other Sufi holy site celebrations. Bezeklik's Thousand Buddha Caves are an example of the religiously motivated vandalism against portraits of religious and human figures.

According to Kashgari's Three Turkic Verse Cycles, the "infidel tribes" suffered three defeats, one at the hands of the Karakhanids in the Irtysh Valley, one by unspecified Muslim Turks, and one inflicted upon "a city between the Tangut and China.", Qatun Sini, at the hands of the Tangut Khan. The war against Buddhist, shamanist, and Manichaean Uyghurs was considered a jihad by the Kara-Khanids., p. 43. Imams and soldiers who died in the battles against the Uyghur Buddhists and Khotan are revered as saints. It's possible the Muslims drove some Uyghur Buddhist monks towards taking asylum in the Tangut Western Xia dynasty.

Mongol rule
In 1209, the Kara-Khoja ruler Baurchuk Art Tekin declared his allegiance to the Mongols under Genghis Khan and the kingdom existed as a vassal state until 1335. After submitting to the Mongols, the Uyghurs served the Mongol rulers as bureaucrats, providing the expertise that the initially illiterate nomads lacked. Qocho continued exist as a vassal to the Mongols of the Yuan dynasty, and were allied to the Yuan against the Chagatai Khanate. Eventually the Chagatai khan Ghiyas-ud-din Baraq eliminated Yuan influence over Qocho. When the Mongols placed the Uyghurs in control of the Koreans at court, the Korean king objected. Emperor Kublai Khan rebuked the Korean king, saying that the Uyghur king ranked higher than the Karluk Kara-Khanid ruler, who in turn was ranked higher than the Korean King, who was ranked last, because the Uyghurs surrendered to the Mongols first, the Karluks surrendered after the Uyghurs, and the Koreans surrendered last, and that the Uyghurs surrendered peacefully without violently resisting.Haw 2014, p. 4. A hybrid court was used when Han Chinese and Uyghurs were in involved in legal issues.

Alans were recruited into the Mongol forces with one unit called the Asud or "Right Alan Guard", which was combined with "recently surrendered" soldiers, Mongols, and Chinese soldiers stationed in the area of the former kingdom of Qocho. In Beshbalik (now Jimsar County), the Mongols established a Chinese military colony led by Chinese general Qi Kongzhi.

Conquest by Muslim Chagatais
The last Buddhist Uyghurs of Qocho and Turpan were converted to Islam by force during a Jihad (holy war) at the hands of the Chagatai Khanate ruler Khizr Khoja (r. 1389-1399). Mirza Haidar Dughlat's Tarikh-i-Rashidi (c. 1540, in Persian) wrote, "(Khizr Khoja) undertook a campaign against Karakhodja [Qocho] and Turfan, two very important towns in China, and forced their inhabitants to become Muslims...". The Chagatai Khanate also conquered Hami, where the  Buddhist religion was also purged and replaced with Islam. Ironically after being converted to Islam, the descendants of the Uyghurs in Turpan failed to retain memory of their Buddhist legacy and were led believe that the "infidel Kalmuks" (Dzungar people) were the ones who built Buddhist monuments in their area. The Encyclopaedia of Islam wrote "By then the Turks of the Turfan [...] forgetting all the other highlights of their past, they attributed the Buddhist and other monuments to the "infidel Kalmuks". 

The Islamic conversion forced on the Buddhist city of Hami was the final blow to Uyghur Buddhism, although some Buddhist influence in the names of Turpan Muslims still remained. Since Islam reached them much after other cities in the Tarim Basin, personal names of pre-Islamic Old Uyghur origin are still used in Hami and Turpan while Uyghurs to the west use mostly Islamic names of Arabic origin. Cherrypicking of history of Xinjiang with the intention of projecting an image of either irreligiousity or piousness of Islam in Uyghur culture has been done for various reasons.

After the conversion to Islam by Uyghurs, the term "Uyghur" fell out of use until it was revived in 1921.

List of kings (idiquts)

The Kingdom of Qocho's rulers trace their lineage to Qutlugh of the Ediz dynasty of the Uyghur Khaganate. There are numerous gaps in our knowledge of the Uyghur rulers of Qocho prior to the thirteenth century. The title of the ruler of Qocho was idiqut or iduq qut. In 1308, Nolen Tekin was granted the title Prince of Gaochang by the Yuan Emperor Ayurbarwada. The following list of rulers is drawn mostly from Turghun Almas, Uyghurlar'' (Almaty, 1992), vol. 1, pp. 180–85. Named rulers based on various sources of other languages are also included.

850–866: Pan Tekin (Pangtele)
866–871: Boko Tekin...
940–948: Irdimin Khan
948–985: Arslan (Zhihai) Khan...
954: Ilig Bilgä T[e]ngri
981: Arslan Bilgä T[e]ngri ilig
996-1007: Bügü Bilgä T[e]ngri ilig
1007-1024: Alp Arsla Qutlugh Kül Bilgä T[e]ngri Qan
1024: Kül Bilgä T[e]ngri Qan
1068: T[e]ngri Bügü il Bilgä Arslan Tngri Uighur Tärkän
1123: Bilgä
1126–????: Bilge (Biliege/Bilgä) Tekin...
????–????: Isen Tomur...
1208/1229–1235/1241: Baurchuq (Barchukh) Art Tekin
1229: Yue-er Tie-mu-er
1235/1242–1245/1246: Qusmayin (Kesmez)
1246–1253/1255: Salun (Salindi) Tekin
1253/1255–1257/1265: Oghrunzh (Ogrunch) Tekin
1257/1265–1265/1266: Mamuraq Tekin
1266–1276/1280: Qozhighar (Qosqar) Tekin
1276/1280–1318: Nolen (Neguril) Tekin
1309/1318: Kiräsiz iduq-qut
1309/1318-1326/1334: Köncök iduq-qut
1318/1322–1327/1330: Tomur (Tamir) Buqa
1327/1330–1331/1332: Sunggi (Senggi) Tekin
1331/1332–1335/1352: Taypan (Taipingnu)
1335–1353: Yuelutiemur
1352-1360: Ching Timür iduq-qut
1353–????: Sangge

Image gallery

See also
Bezeklik Thousand Buddha Caves
Kara Del
Ming–Turpan conflict
Ganzhou Uyghur Kingdom
Islamization and Turkification of Xinjiang
History of the Uyghur people
History of Xinjiang
Silk Road transmission of Buddhism

References

Citations

Sources

Further reading

843 establishments
Former countries in Chinese history
History of Buddhism in China
History of Xinjiang
Former kingdoms
Vassal and tributary states of the Mongol Empire